Ernest Eric Hawkey (1 June 190925 July 1986) was the sixth Bishop of Carpentaria from 1968 to 1974.

He was educated at Trinity Grammar School, Sydney and ordained deacon in 1933 and priest in 1936. After curacies at St Alban's, Ultimo (1933-34) and St Paul's, Burwood (1934-40) he was Priest in charge at Kandos (1940-46) and then Rector (1946-47). From 1947 to 1968 he was Secretary of the Australian Board of Missions and from 1962 a Canon Residentiary at St John's Cathedral, Brisbane. He was consecrated a bishop on 23 April 1968 at St John's Cathedral (Brisbane). In 1970 he ordinaed the first Aborigine to become a priest, Patrick Brisbane.

References

1909 births
People educated at Trinity Grammar School (New South Wales)
Anglican bishops of Carpentaria
20th-century Anglican bishops in Australia
Officers of the Order of the British Empire
1986 deaths